Xenia Valderi (born January 21, 1926) is a Yugoslav-born Italian actress.

Early life
The daughter of a Dalmatian father and German mother, Xenia Valdameri was born at Split in Croatia. She moved to Rome as a young woman after World War II, for a career in acting.

Career
Xenia Valderi (she used a shorter version of her original surname) appeared regularly in Italian films of the 1950s and 1960s, including Gianni Puccini's The Captain of Venice (1951), Mario Amendola and Ruggero Maccari's Il tallone di Achille (1952), Carlo Borghesio's The Steel Rope (1953), Luigi Comencini's La valigia dei sogni (1953), Luigi Zampa's Woman of Rome (1954) with Gina Lollabrigida, Lionello De Felice's Too Young for Love (1955), De Felice's Desperate Farewell (1955), Federico Fellini's Il Bidone (1955), De Felice's 100 Years of Love (1954),  Mario Mattoli's Move and I'll Shoot (1958), Mattoli's Non perdiamo la testa (1959), Lucio Fulci's The Swindlers (1963), Michelangelo Antonioni's Red Desert (1964), with Monica Vitti and Richard Harris, and Ettore Maria Fizzarotti Mi vedrai tornare (1966). She was specialized in bourgeois, snobby and often scatterbrained characters. She was also featured in some Italian television programs and on the musical comedy stage.

Personal life
Xenia Valderi was said to be romantically involved with fellow actor Jacques Sernas in 1954.

References

External links
 

1926 births
Possibly living people
Italian film actresses
Actors from Split, Croatia
Italian television actresses
Italian stage actresses
20th-century Italian actresses
Yugoslav emigrants to Italy
Italian people of German descent
Italian people of Croatian descent